Laura Asencio (born 14 May 1998) is a French professional racing cyclist, who currently rides for UCI Women's Continental Team .

References

External links
 

1998 births
Living people
French female cyclists
Cyclists from Auvergne-Rhône-Alpes
Sportspeople from Valence, Drôme
21st-century French women